USS Mustin may refer to:

 , was a  during World War II
 , is an  guided missile destroyer currently in active service

United States Navy ship names